The Ministry of Nature Management and Ecology of the Republic of Bashkortostan is an agency of the government of Bashkortostan, headquartered in 28, Lenin Street, Ufa.

Ministers 
After the 2019 Head of the Ministry has been Ural Iskandarov.

References

External links
Ministry of Nature Management and Ecology (Bashkortostan)
 

Politics of Bashkortostan
Nature
Bashkortostan
Indigenous peoples and the environment